The 2005 Ms. Olympia contest 
is an IFBB professional bodybuilding competition and part of Joe Weider's Olympia Fitness & Performance Weekend 2005 was held on October 21, 2005, at the South Hall in the Las Vegas Convention Center in Winchester, Nevada and in the Orleans Arena at The Orleans Hotel and Casino in Paradise, Nevada. It was the 26th Ms. Olympia competition held. Other events at the exhibition include the Mr. Olympia, Fitness Olympia, Figure Olympia, and Olympia Wildcard contests.

Prize money
 1st $30,000
 2nd $18.000
 3rd $10,000
 4th $7,000
 5th $4,000
 6th $2,000
Total: $71,000

Competitors' weight
 Yaxeni Oriquen-Garcia - 
 Betty Pariso - 
 Betty Viana-Adkins - 
 Annie Rivieccio - 
 Bonny Priest - 
 Iris Kyle - 
 Jitka Harazimova - 
 Mah-Ann Mendoza - 
 Brenda Raganot - 
 Dayana Cadeau - 
 Marja Lehtonen - 
 Toni Norman - 
 Desiree Ellis - 
 Tonia Williams - 
 Rosemary Jennings -

Results

Scorecard

Comparison to previous Olympia results:
+2 - Yaxeni Oriquen-Garcia
-1 - Iris Kyle
-2 - Dayana Cadeau
-6 - Jitka Harazimova
-1 - Brenda Ragonot
+1 - Bonny Priest
-2 - Betty Viana-Adkins
-4 - Betty Pariso
-1 - Rosemary Jennings
-6 - Rosemary Jennings
-5 - Mah-Ann Mendoza
-10 - Desiree Ellis

Attended
8th Ms. Olympia attended - Yaxeni Oriquen-Garcia
7th Ms. Olympia attended - Iris Kyle
6th Ms. Olympia attended - Dayana Cadeau
5th Ms. Olympia attended - Betty Pariso
4th Ms. Olympia attended - Brenda Ragonot and Betty Viana-Adkins
3rd Ms. Olympia attended - Jitka Harazimova
2nd Ms. Olympia attended - Desiree Ellis, Rosemary Jennings, Marja Lehtonen, Mah-Ann Mendoza, and Bonnie Priest
1st Ms. Olympia attended - Antionette Norman, Annie Rivieccio, and Tonia Williams
Previous year Olympia attendees who did not attend - Lisa Aukland, Vilma Caez, Valentina Chepiga, Nancy Lewis, Joanna Thomas

Notable events

2005 Ms. Olympia changes 
The IFBB introduced the so-called '20 percent rule', requesting "that female athletes in Bodybuilding, Fitness and Figure decrease the amount of muscularity by a factor of 20%". The memo stated that the request "applies to those female athletes whose physiques require the decrease". Another change added to the 2005 Ms. Olympia, was the abandonment of the weight class system adopted in 2000. In 2005 Ms. Olympia, Iris Kyle was dethroned by Yaxeni Oriquen-Garcia.

2005 Ms. Olympia Qualified

See also
 2005 Mr. Olympia

References

2005 in bodybuilding
Ms. Olympia
Ms. Olympia
History of female bodybuilding
Ms. Olympia 2005